Ancylodactylus mathewsensis is a species of gecko. It is endemic to Kenya.

References

Endemic fauna of Kenya
Ancylodactylus
Reptiles described in 2022